Bluegrass Album, Vol. 5 - —Sweet Sunny South is a fifth album by bluegrass supergroup, Bluegrass Album Band, released in 1989. Violinist Vassar Clements is on this album replacing Bobby Hicks,  and bass duties are taken over by Mark Schatz (instead of Todd Philips, who otherwise plays on all Bluegrass Album Band albums.

Track listing 
 "Rock Hearts" (Bill Otis) 2:37
 "Big Black Train" (Stanley Johnson, George Sherry) 3:01
 "Thinking About You" (Lester Flatt, Earl Scruggs) 3:18
 "Out In The Cold World" (Traditional) 3:09
 "On The Old Kentucky Shore" (Bill Monroe) 3:52
 "Preaching, Praying, Singing" (E.C. McCarty) 2:33
 "Someone Took My Place With You" (Lester Flatt, Tom Gurney, Earl Scruggs) 2:47
 "Foggy Mountain Rock" (Louise Certain, Lester Flatt, Josh Graves) 3:58
 "My Home's Across The Blue Ridge Mountains" (Traditional) 2:42
 "Along About Daybreak" (Bill Monroe) 3:49
 "Sweet Sunny South "(Traditional) 3:27

Personnel 
 Tony Rice - guitar, vocals
 J.D. Crowe - banjo, lead guitar track 6,vocals
 Doyle Lawson - mandolin, vocals
 Vassar Clements - fiddle
 Jerry Douglas - Dobro, vocals
 Mark Schatz - bass

References 

1989 albums
Rounder Records albums